The Estadio Latinoamericano (Spanish for Latin American Stadium) is a stadium in Havana, Cuba.  It is primarily used for baseball, and is the second largest baseball stadium in the world by capacity. Gran Estadio, a spacious pitchers' park with prevailing winds blowing in and boasting a playing surface and lighting system of major-league quality, was built in 1946 as the top baseball park in Latin America. Located in the Cerro neighborhood, it opened with the name Gran Estadio de La Habana and currently holds about 55,000 people. In 1999, it also hosted an exhibition series between the Cuban National Team and the Baltimore Orioles.

Overview
The Estadio Latinoamericano is popularly known in Cuba as "The Colossus of Cerro".  It was initially named Gran Estadio de La Habana (Great Stadium of Havana), but it was then named Estadio del Cerro (Stadium of Cerro) until 1961, when it was renamed as Estadio Latinoamericano (Latin American Stadium) when Cuban professional baseball was stopped. It opened on October 26, 1946, surpassing La Tropical Stadium as the largest stadium in Havana.

History
The stadium debuted on October 26, 1946 before a crowd of 31,000 fans for a clash between the Almendares and Cienfuegos baseball teams, the largest crowd that had attended a sports event in Cuba. Almendares won the game 9-1. The Venezuelan Alejandro Carrasquel, who played for the Washington Senators in the Major League, threw the first pitch of the game.

In its 70 years, the stadium has been utilised for diverse spectacles including popular dance performances and boxing matches.

The stadium was renovated and expanded in 1971. Its stands were enlarged, increasing its capacity to 55,000 spectators, and its gardens were extended.

On March 22, 2016, the Tampa Bay Rays faced the Cuban national baseball team in an exhibition game. This was attended by numerous dignitaries, including President of the United States Barack Obama and Raul Castro. This game represented the thaw between the two countries that had occurred in recent years, and was broadcast live on ESPN. The Rays were selected after a lottery conducted by Major League Baseball. The Rays won 4-1.

The stadium has also been used for political purposes. In 1956, it was the location of a student demonstration headed by José Antonio Echeverría, against the Government of Fulgencio Batista.

See also
Estadio Panamericano
Estadio Pedro Marrero

External links

Estadio Latinoamericano on miamiherald.com

Baseball venues in Cuba
Sports venues in Havana
Brooklyn Dodgers spring training venues
Pittsburgh Pirates spring training venues
National stadiums
Sports venues completed in 1946
Baseball in Havana
20th-century architecture in Cuba